Leon Lumsdaine (31 January 1923 – 29 March 1966) was a British modern pentathlete. He competed at the 1952 Summer Olympics.

References

1923 births
1966 deaths
British male modern pentathletes
Olympic modern pentathletes of Great Britain
Modern pentathletes at the 1952 Summer Olympics
Athletes from Shanghai